Hyalinella is a genus of bryozoans belonging to the family Plumatellidae.

The species of this genus are found in Europe, Northern America and Australia.

Species:

Hyalinella africana 
Hyalinella diwaniensis 
Hyalinella lendenfeldi 
Hyalinella orbisperma 
Hyalinella punctata 
Hyalinella vaihiriae

References

Bryozoan genera